Hypocrita toulgoetae is a moth of the family Erebidae. It was described by Christian Gibeaux in 1982. It is found in Ecuador.

References

 

Hypocrita
Moths described in 1982